Vilks (feminine: Vilka) is a Latvian surname, derived from the Latvian word for "wolf". Individuals with the surname include:

Andris Vilks (born 1963), Latvian politician
Girts Vilks (born 1968), Soviet rower
Lars Vilks (born 1946), Swedish artist

Latvian-language masculine surnames